The Bangladesh Premier League (BPL) is a professional Twenty20 cricket league organized by BPL Governing Council . The BPL is one of the three professional cricket leagues in Bangladesh. It is the 16th most attended premier league in the world. In winter, each team faces the other twice in the league stage. Following the conclusion of the regular season, the top four teams advance to the playoffs, a single-elimination game, and two qualifier games culminating in the Championship game, between the winner of Qualifier 1 and Qualifier 2.

The Bangladesh Premier League was formed in 2011 by the Bangladesh Cricket Board, after the suspension of its predecessor organisation, 2009/10 National Cricket League Twenty20. The first season was held in February 2012, and the games were held across Dhaka and Chittagong. The BPL is headed by the chairman of its Governing Council.

The 2020 version of BPL was meant to be held without franchise involvement, with the Bangladesh Cricket Board (BCB) arranging the tournament. The decision came after the meeting between BCB and franchises owners whereas BCB failed to meet the demand placed by different team owners. In October 2020, the BCB confirmed that there would not be another tournament in 2020, due to the COVID-19 pandemic.

Comilla Victorians is the defending champion, winning their fourth title, becoming the most successful team.

History
Following the success of franchise Twenty20, cricket leagues such as the Indian Premier League around the world, the Bangladesh Cricket Board announced a plan to replace the National Cricket League with a franchise-based league. On 18 January 2012, the board entered a 6-year, 350-crore deal with Game on Sports Group to establish a franchise tournament. The deal gave the group exclusive management rights to the tournament. The league was founded with six franchises from the largest cities of Bangladesh. During the franchise auction, 13 companies took part in the bidding process, with six winning the rights of each club.

In July 2022, after the ICC accommodated the month of January and February for the BPL, in its ICC Future Tours Programme, the BCB announced the schedule of the BPL for the next three seasons. Accordingly, the ninth season was scheduled to be held from 5 January to 16 February in 2023, the tenth season was scheduled from 6 January to 17 February 2024 and the eleventh season was scheduled to be played from 1 January to 11 February 2025. Besides, the board also decided for the first time to sell the franchise rights for a 3 years term.

2012 (1st edition)
The first edition of the league officially kicked off on 9 February 2012, with a lavish opening ceremony at the Sher-e-Bangla National Cricket Stadium in Dhaka, the capital city of Bangladesh. The initial player auction was held on 18 and 19 January 2012 and the first match in the tournament staged on 9 February 2012 at the Sher-e-Bangla National Cricket Stadium between Sylhet Royals and Barisal Burners. The first final game was between Dhaka Gladiators and Barisal Burners, with Dhaka Gladiators emerging as champions after winning by eight wickets. All matches in the first edition of the league were held at the Sher-e-Bangla National Cricket Stadium and Zohur Ahmed Chowdhury Stadium in the country's second-largest city Chittagong.

2013 (2nd edition)
Rangpur Riders were added as a seventh team for the second season. Dhaka Gladiators again emerged as champions beating Chittagong Kings in the final by 43 runs. Once again Sher-e-Bangla National Cricket Stadium in Dhaka hosted the final. For most of the matches, the MA Aziz Stadium, replaced the Zohur Ahmed Chowdhury Stadium in Chittagong due to higher capacity and Sheikh Abu Naser Stadium in Khulna (third-largest city) was added as the third venue.

Following accusations of match-fixing during the 2012–13 season, the owners of all six original franchises were suspended in 2013 due to constant violations of the league regulations and constant delays in players’ salary handover. The owners of Dhaka Gladiators were handed a lifetime suspension by the governing committee. A number of players and administrators were handed bans for match-fixing, including the former captain of Bangladesh, Mohammad Ashraful.

2015 (3rd edition)
Following the match-fixing scandal, the league was not played in the year 2014. It returned in 2015 with six new franchises and it was held in the winter season unlike spring previously. Comilla Victorians won the competition, beating Barisal Bulls by three wickets. Leading upto the  2016–17 edition of the league, the Sylhet Super Stars, were suspended following breaches of disciplinary regulations, and two new franchises, Khulna Titans and Rajshahi Kings, were introduced, bringing the number of teams in the competition back to seven.

2016 (4th edition)
In the 2016 edition, Dhaka Dynamites won the tournament for the third time by defeating Rajshahi Kings in the final.

2017 (5th edition)
In the 2017–18 edition of the league, the Sylhet franchise returned as the Sylhet Sixers with new ownership and management. As a result, the Sylhet International Cricket Stadium was also listed as a third venue. Barisal Bulls franchise was suspended due to financial mishaps.

2018 (6th edition) 
2018-19 Bangladesh Premier League was won by Comilla Victorians. They defeated Dhaka Dynamites as they won their second BPL title. Mashrafe Mortaza became the most successful captain with 4 trophies. (Dhaka Gladiators: 2012, 2013; Comilla Victorians: 2015; Rangpur Riders: 2017)

2019 (7th edition)
In September 2019, BCB President Nazmul Hasan Papon informed the media about certain changes in rules and regulations for the 2019–20 season and eliminating all franchises, BCB took over the charge and decided to run this tournament by the board itself and named the tournament as Bangabandhu BPL T20 2019 in order to pay homage to Sheikh Mujibur Rahman on his birth centenary.

Rajshahi Royals defeated Khulna Tigers by 21 runs in the final match. Royals skipper Andre Russell was elected as both Man of the match for the final and Player of the Tournament for his all-round performances and for leading his side to their maiden BPL title.

2022 (8th edition)
The 2021–22 season, the eighth edition also named Bangabandhu Bangladesh Premier League T20 (BBPL T20)–2022, was initially scheduled to start in March 2021. However, the tournament was postponed and rescheduled to be held from 21 January to 18 February 2022. In December 2021, all six teams were announced, with Rangpur Rangers and the defending champion Rajshahi Royals being excluded, a franchise from Barisal was included and Comilla Victorians also returned after a year's break. Initially, Rupa Steel & Marn Group owned the Dhaka franchise, but a day before the players' draft their ownership was terminated due to non compliance of rules. However, the Minister Group took ownership of the franchise after the players' draft. Due to the unavailability of technical teams the DRS system could not used in this season. Initially, BCB decided to allow spectators this year, however, due to the rise of Omicron variants, the board backed out from its decision and decided to play behind closed doors.

The two points table topper teams Fortune Barishal and Comilla Victorians reached the final. In the final, Comilla Victorians defended 151 runs to win their third title in a thrilling 1-run victory. Sunil Narine was the Player of the Final for his all-round performances. Shakib Al Hasan, captain of the runners-up team, Fortune Barishal, received the Player of the Tournament award for his all-round performance, having scored 284 runs in 11 innings and picked up 16 wickets.

League organisation

At a corporate level, the Bangladesh Premier League considers itself an association made up of and financed by its member teams. All income generated through television rights, licensing agreements, sponsorship, ticket sales and other means is earned and shared between the Bangladesh Cricket Board and the participating franchises. The league is controlled by a Governing Council (GC). As the parent organisation, the Bangladesh Cricket Board appoints the GC's members.

As of the 2018–19 season, the league consists of seven franchises. Each team players every other team twice in the round-robin stage of the competition with the teams with the top 4 advancing to a series of play-off matches. These lead to a championship match in which the league champion is decided.

Current teams

Draft system
The BPL operates a draft system to assign players to teams. Franchises can choose new players during an annual draft. Teams can also choose to retain players from one year to the next and players can also be signed outside of the draft and traded between organisations. Since 2015, Imago Sports Management has been conducting the players draft event also is the official players management partner of Bangladesh Cricket Board for Bangladesh Premier League

Tournament seasons and results

Statistics

Overall team performances
Records include all matches played under the name of a franchise, even where the franchise has been suspended and re-created as a new organisation.

Note:
 Tie&W and Tie&L indicate matches tied and then won or lost by "Super Over"
 The win percentage excludes no results.

Overall team standings

Team performances

Sponsorship
For the first season of the tournament, Bangladeshi conglomerate Destiny Group was the main sponsor of the tournament, negotiating a one-year sponsorship package for 75 million taka (US$1.0 million). Prime Bank Limited was awarded the sponsorship deal for the second season for 100 million taka (US$1.5 million). BRB Cables Limited held the sponsorship rights for third season in 2015 with 150 million taka (US$2.0 million). Abul Khair Steel (AKS), a sister concern group of Abul Khair Industries Limited became the title sponsor of the fourth and fifth editions.

Broadcasters

See also 
 List of Bangladesh Premier League captains
 List of Bangladesh Premier League records and statistics
 Big Bash League

Notes

References 

 
Twenty20 cricket leagues
Recurring sporting events established in 2012
2012 establishments in Bangladesh
Professional cricket leagues